Al-Nuwayrī, full name Shihāb al-Dīn Aḥmad bin ʿAbd al-Wahhāb al-Nuwayrī (born April 5, 1279 in Akhmim, present-day Egypt – died June 5, 1333 in Cairo) was an Egyptian Muslim historian and civil servant of the Bahri Mamluk dynasty.   He is most notable for his compilation of a 9,000-page encyclopedia of the Mamluk era, titled The Ultimate Ambition in the Arts of Erudition, which pertained to zoology, anatomy, history, chronology, amongst others. He is also known for his extensive work regarding the Mongols' conquest of Syria.  Al-Nuwayri started his encyclopedia around the year 1314 and completed it in 1333.

Life
The name Al-Nuwayri is a nisba referring to the village of Al-Nuwayra in present-day Beni Suef Governorate.  Al-Nuwayri was born April 5, 1279 in Akhmim, Egypt.  For most of his childhood, he lived in Qus in Upper Egypt, where he studied with Ibn Daqiq al-'Id. He later studied at Al-Azhar University in Cairo, specializing in the study of the hadith and the sira, in addition to history.  Skilled in calligraphy, he reportedly made a copy of Sahih al-Bukhari which he sold for 1000 dinars. He worked as a civil servant in the administration of Sultan An-Nasir Muhammad starting at age of 23, serving in various roles including property manager for the Sultan and superintendent of army finances in Tripoli.  At some point after 1312, he retired from government service and took a job copying manuscripts in order to support himself while compiling his encyclopedia. He died on June 5, 1333 in Cairo.

Encyclopedia
Al-Nuwayri's encyclopedia, The Ultimate Ambition in the Arts of Erudition, was divided into five sections (books):
 Geography and astronomy
 Man, and what relates to him
 Animals
 Plants
 History

The first four subjects comprised 10 volumes, while the last filled 21 volumes.

ِAl-Nuwayri based his encyclopedia on several earlier works. In fact, the only wholly original portions are the discussion of financial secretaryship in book two, and some of the historical material in book five. The rest of the work was a compilation of a number of texts including Delightful Concepts and the Path to Precepts (Mabahij al-fikar wa manahij al-'ibar) by Jamal al-Din al-Watwat and Avicenna's Canon of Medicine.

References

Further reading
The Historiography of Islamic Egypt (c. 950-1800), "Al-Nuwayrī as a historian of the Mongols", p. 23 and seq. Reuven Amitai. Online

Historians of Asia
14th-century Egyptian historians
1279 births
1333 deaths
Encyclopedists of the medieval Islamic world
Egyptian historians of Islam
Historians from the Mamluk Sultanate